State Route 88 (SR 88) is a  state highway that travels southwest-to-northeast through portions of Washington, Jefferson, Burke, and Richmond counties in the east-central part of the U.S. state of Georgia. The highway connects the Sandersville area with Hephzibah, via Wrens, with a brief portion in Augusta.

From its western terminus east of Sandersville to Wrens, SR 88 is part of the Fall Line Freeway, a highway that connects Columbus and Augusta, partially as a truck route, and is signed as SR 540. It may also be incorporated into the proposed eastern extension of Interstate 14 (I-14), an Interstate Highway that is currently entirely within Central Texas and may be extended to Augusta.

Route description
SR 88 begins at an intersection with SR 24/SR 540 (SR 24 is known as Ridge Road south of this intersection; SR 24 and SR 540 is part of the Fall Line Freeway west of here), just east of Sandersville, in the central part of Washington County. At this intersection, it begins a concurrency with SR 540 (and the Fall Line Freeway). The two highways head northeast to an intersection with the northern terminus of SR 231 and the southern terminus of Tree Nursery Road, north-northwest of Davisboro. This is just before the highways cross over the Ogeechee River on the Fenns Bridge into Jefferson County. Not too far into the county is an intersection with SR 171 (Grange Road). South of Stapleton is SR 296. SR 88 and SR 540 continue to the northwest, until they meet US 1/US 221/SR 4/SR 17 (Jefferson Davis Memorial Highway) in the extreme southwestern part of Wrens. The six highways travel concurrently to the north-northeast into the main part of the city. At an intersection with the western terminus of Howard Street and the southern terminus of Thomson Highway, SR 17 departs to the north-northwest onto Thomson Highway. A few blocks later, they intersect SR 80. At this intersection, SR 80/SR 88 head to the east. At Waynesboro Road, SR 80 departs to the south-southeast, while SR 88 continues its east-northeastern routing. Then, it gradually curves to a near-due-eastern direction, before heading southeast at Matthews. After that, it heads east-northeast, and then northeast, until it enters Burke County, just before it meets SR 305. Here, it heads north-northeast, and straddles the county line for a short distance, into Keysville. The highway briefly heads north-northwest before it turns to the northeast and enters Richmond County and the city limits of Augusta. After a brief portion in the city, it enters the city of Blythe. Here, the path of SR 88 and that of US 1/SR 4/SR 540 come very close together, forming the shape of the letter "K", but with a very short horizontal line connecting its upright parts. The two highway paths do not actually intersect, as there is a very brief connecting road between them. SR 88 curves to the east-northeast and re-enters Augusta. It curves to the east-southeast and enters Hephzibah. On the northeastern edge of the city, on the Hephzibah–Augusta line, it meets its eastern terminus, an intersection with US 25/SR 121 (Peach Orchard Road).

The only portion of SR 88 that is part of the National Highway System, a system of routes determined to be the most important for the nation's economy, mobility, and defense, is the entire SR 540 concurrency, from east of Sandersville to Wrens.

History

Reassurance shields for SR 88  were removed on the Fall Line Freeway in June 2020.

Future

The route of SR 88 is being absorbed into the Fall Line Freeway, which is planned to extend from the Alabama state line in Columbus to an interchange with I-20 and I-520 in Augusta. It could also become part of the future I-14.

Major intersections

See also

References

External links

 Georgia Roads (Routes 81–100)

088
Transportation in Washington County, Georgia
Transportation in Jefferson County, Georgia
Transportation in Burke County, Georgia
Transportation in Richmond County, Georgia
Transportation in Augusta, Georgia